Sulab (also Romanized as Sūlāb) is a village in Shahsavan Kandi Rural District, in the Central District of Saveh County, Markazi Province, Iran. At the 2006 census, its population was 5, in 4 families.

References 

Populated places in Saveh County